The Hagener Au is a stream, roughly  long, in the district of Plön in the north German state of Schleswig-Holstein. It is an outlet of the Passader See. From the lake's southwestern bay the stream flows in a northerly direction and discharges between Laboe and Stein in the Baltic Sea.

Sections of the Hagener Au are very natural and surrounded by wetlands. In addition the stream is a habitat for the rare spined loach. The stream has been straightened near its mouth and the last  runs through a pipe.
Together with the Passader See the Hagener Au is a protected Special Area of Conservation.

See also 
List of rivers of Schleswig-Holstein

External links 
  Hagener Au and Passader See (pdf file, 17 KB)

Plön (district)
Rivers of Schleswig-Holstein
Special Areas of Conservation in Germany
 
Rivers of Germany